Palpitomonas bilix is a protist species first described in 2010.

References

Cryptista